Sergei Kovalev (1930–2021) was a Russian human rights activist.

Sergei Kovalev, Sergei Kovalyov or variations may also refer to:

 Sergey Kovalev (born 1983), Russian boxer
 Sergey Kovalev (historian) (1886–1960), Soviet historian
 Sergei Kovalyov (footballer, born 1965), Russian footballer
 Sergei Kovalyov (footballer, born 1972), Russian footballer
 Sergei Nikitich Kovalev (1919–2011), Russian submarine designer